Lithothelium echinatum is a species of saxicolous (rock-dwelling) lichen in the family Pyrenulaceae. Found in China, it was formally described as a new species in 2006 by Dutch lichenologist André Aptroot. Lithothelium echinatum is the only species in genus Lithothelium that has echinate ascospores (i.e., with pointed spines).

References

Eurotiomycetes
Lichen species
Lichens described in 2006
Lichens of China
Taxa named by André Aptroot